The Texture ov Despise is the debut studio album of Christ Analogue, released in May 1995 by Manifest Records.

Reception
A critic at Sonic Boom praised the band's' unique sound and said "the caustic mesh behind the guitar work, the harsh vocals, and programming is often intense and overwhelming."

Track listing

Personnel
Adapted from the album's liner notes.

Christ Analogue
 Wade Alin – programming, arrangements, production

Additional musicians
 Casha – instruments (6)
 Rey Guajardo – instruments and arrangements (8)

Production and design
 Chrome – design
 Markus Von Prause – assistant engineering, instruments (1)

Release history

References

External links 
 The Texture ov Despise at Bandcamp
 

1995 debut albums
Christ Analogue albums
Albums produced by Wade Alin